The 2019–20 season was the 118th season of competitive football in Italy. On 9 March 2020, the Italian government halted all sports events in Italy until 3 April 2020 due to the coronavirus pandemic in Italy. On 18 May, it was announced that Italian football would be suspended until 14 June. On 28 May, it was announced that Serie A and Serie B would resume starting 20 June. Serie C and Serie D, however, did not resume with table leaders announced as champions in Serie C, and no winners announced.

Promotions and relegations (pre-season)
Teams promoted to Serie A
 Brescia
 Lecce
 Hellas Verona

Teams relegated from Serie A
 Chievo
 Frosinone
 Empoli

Teams promoted to Serie B
 Virtus Entella
 Pordenone
 Juve Stabia
 Pisa
 Trapani
Teams relegated from Serie B
 Padova
 Carpi
 Foggia
 Palermo (to Serie D)

National teams

Men

Italy national football team

Friendlies

UEFA Euro 2020 qualifying

Group J

UEFA Euro 2020 
On 17 March 2020, UEFA confirmed that UEFA Euro 2020 had been postponed by one year in response to the COVID-19 pandemic in Europe.

Women

UEFA Women's Euro 2021 qualifying

Group B

2020 Algarve Cup

League season

Men

Serie A

Serie B

Promotion play-offs

Serie C

Serie D

Women

Serie A (women)

Cup competitions

Coppa Italia

Final

Supercoppa Italiana

UEFA competitions

UEFA Champions League

Group stage

Group C

Group D

Group E

Group F

Knockout phase

Round of 16

|}

Quarter-finals

|}

UEFA Europa League

Second qualifying round

|}

Third qualifying round

|}

Play-off round

|}

Group stage

Group E

Group J

Knockout phase

Round of 32

|}

Round of 16

|}

Quarter-finals

|}

Semi-finals

|}

Final

UEFA Youth League

UEFA Champions League Path

Group C

Group D

Group E

Group F

Knockout phase

Round of 16

|}

Quarter-finals

|}

UEFA Women's Champions League

Knockout phase

Round of 32

|}
Notes

Notes

References 

 
Seasons in Italian football
Football
Football
Italy
Italy
2019 sport-related lists